"Red" is a maxi-single by the Japanese rock band, The Gazette. It was released on September 22, 2010 in two editions; the "Optical Impression" edition, "Auditory Impression" edition. The first includes the songs "Red" and "Vermin"- it also includes a DVD containing the music video and making for the song "Red". The second comes with a bonus track, "An Unbearable Fact".

Track listing

Red: Optical Impression
Disk one
 "Red" - 3:25
 "Vermin" - 3:50
Disc two (DVD)
 "Red: Music Clip + Making" - 6:60

Red: Auditory Impression
 "Red" - 3:25
 "Vermin" - 3:50
 "An Unbearable Fact" - 3:33

Notes
 This single was known a few months before the release date.
 Promotional video was available two weeks before the actual release date.
 The single reached a peak mark of #6 on the Japanese Oricon Weekly Charts.

References

2010 singles
The Gazette (band) songs
2010 songs
Sony Music Entertainment Japan singles

ja:Red
pt:Red